Jörg Engesser (born 25 May 1981) is a German curler.

At the national level, he is a two-time German men's champion curler (2003, 2015).

Teams

References

External links

Living people
1981 births
German male curlers
German curling champions
Place of birth missing (living people)
21st-century German people